Stockland Corporation Limited is a diversified Australian property development company. It has business in shopping centres, housing estates, industrial estates and manufactured housing communities.

History
Stockland was founded in 1952 by Albert Scheinberg and Ervin Graf. In 1957 Stockland listed on the Australian Stock Exchange by acquiring a controlling interest in Simon Hickey Industries Ltd, the smallest company then listed.

In the same year, Stockland's activities became more diversified, moving into commercial development, initially with retail projects in suburbs of Sydney. In 1965 Stockland opened its first big commercial development - the redeveloped Imperial Arcade, Sydney in Sydney's CBD, which offered the first underground link to David Jones, four retail levels and six levels of office space.

Its current activities include:
 management of shopping centres, 41 centres valued at $5 billion across Australia.
 development of 65 residential communities with end-market value of approximately $21.2 billion.
 ownership and management of 16 offices in Australian capital cities
 13 distribution and industrial centres 
 59 established retirement living villages.
The current managing director is Tarun Gupta, and the board chairman is Tom Pockett.

List of Shopping Centres

New South Wales

 Stockland Balgowlah
 Stockland Forster
Stockland Glendale
 Stockland Green Hills
Stockland Merrylands
 Stockland Nowra
 Stockland Piccadilly
Stockland Shellhabour
Stockland Wetherill Park

Queensland

Baringa
Nirimba
Benowa Gardens
Bundaberg
Burleigh Heads
Cairns
Caloundra
Cleveland
Gladstone
Hervey Bay
Kensington
North Shore 
Pacific Pines
 Warwick
Rockhampton
Townsville

Victoria

Highlands
Point Cook
The Pines
Tooronga
Traralgon (sold March 2021)
Wendouree

Western Australia
Baldivis
Bull Creek
Harrisdale
Riverton
Brabham

See also
Shopping property management firms

References

Companies listed on the Australian Securities Exchange
Real estate companies of Australia
Shopping center management firms
Companies based in Sydney
Australian companies established in 1952
Real estate companies established in 1952